State Route 612 (SR 612) was a state route located in Cuyahoga County, Ohio. The route existed from 1937 until 1951.

Route description
SR 612 traveled on what is now West 130th Street in western Cuyahoga County. The route began at SR 82 on the Strongsville–North Royalton line. It continued northward, traversing along the borders of Stongsville, North Royalton, Middleburg Heights, Parma, Brook Park, and Parma Heights, before intersecting SR 17 on the border of Cleveland and Parma. The highway continued further north to SR 10 in Cleveland, where it terminated.

History
SR 612 was formed in 1937, running between SR 82 and SR 17. In 1939, the northern terminus for SR 612 was extended an extra , to a new terminus at SR 10 in Cleveland. The route was deleted from the state highway system in 1951.

Major intersections

Notes

References

612
Transportation in Cuyahoga County, Ohio
Transportation in Cleveland